The 2007 Indian Federation Cup Final was the 29th final of the Indian Federation Cup, the top knock-out competition in India, and was contested between Kolkata giants East Bengal and Mahindra United on 15 September 2007.

East Bengal won the final 2–1 with a brace from Brazilian forward Edmilson Marques Pardal to claim their fifth Federation Cup title.

Route to the final

East Bengal

East Bengal entered the 2007 Indian Federation Cup automatically as they were already in the I-League. In the Pre-Quarter Finals, East Bengal faced Kolkata giants Mohammedan Sporting in their opening match and won 3–1 with Ashim Biswas putting them ahead in the 21st minute. Kalia Kulothungan equalised for Mohammedan ilast eightQuarter-Final. In the Quarter-Final, East Bengal faced hosts JCT and in a thriller of a game, East Bengal won 3–2 with another brace from Edmilson after Irungbam Surkumar Singh put them ahead in the 14th minute. Eduardo da Silva Escobar and Renedy Singh scored for JCT. In the Semi Final, it was a Kolkata Derby as East Bengal faced arch-rivals Mohun Bagan. Bhaichung Bhutia put Mohun Bagan ahead in the 12th minute but East Bengal rallied from behind to score three. Surkumar Singh equalised in the 25th minute while Dipendu Biswas and Ashim Biswas scored the other two. José Ramirez Barreto's goal in the 71st minute wasn't enough for Bagan as East Bengal won 3–2 to reach the final.

Mahindra United

Mahindra United entered the 2007 Indian Federation Cup automatically as they were already in the I-League. In the Pre-Quarter Finals, they faced HAL and won it courtesy of a solitary goal from Steven Dias in the 9th minute. In the Quarter Final, they faced Sporting Clube de Goa and after 120 minutes the game ended 1–1 and Mahindra won 5–4 via penalty shootout to reach the last four of the tournament. In the Semi Final, Mahindra United faced the reigning I-league champions Dempo and the match once again remained deadlock at 1–1 after 120 minutes. Manjit Singh put Mahindra ahead in the 32nd minute but Beto equalised for Dempo just six minutes later. Mahindra won the game 3–1 in the penalty shootout to reach the final.

Match

Details

See also
 29th "Hero Cycles" Federation Cup 2007

References

East Bengal Club matches
Indian Federation Cup Finals
Mahindra United FC matches